Parkhead was a railway station in the east end of Glasgow. It was opened as Parkhead, by the North British Railway on 1 February 1871. It was renamed Parkhead North on 30 June 1952 by  British Railways. This was to differentiate it from the nearby ex-Caledonian Railway Parkhead station on the former Glasgow Central Railway.

The station was closed to passengers on 19 September 1955.

References

Notes

Sources
 
 
 
 

Disused railway stations in Glasgow
Railway stations in Great Britain opened in 1871
Railway stations in Great Britain closed in 1955
Former North British Railway stations
Parkhead